Jehad Al Baour (born 27 June 1987 in Damascus, Syria) is a Syrian footballer. He currently plays for Al-Jaish , which competes in the Syrian Premier League, the top division in Syria.

Baour was selected to Valeriu Tiţa's 23-man final squad for the 2011 AFC Asian Cup in Qatar, but he did not appear in any of the three Syrian group games.

Honour and Titles

Club 
Al-Jaish
 Syrian Premier League: 2009–10

References

External links 
 

1987 births
Living people
Sportspeople from Damascus
Syrian footballers
Association football defenders
Syria international footballers
Syrian expatriate footballers
Expatriate footballers in Lebanon
Syrian expatriate sportspeople in Lebanon
Expatriate footballers in Jordan
Syrian expatriate sportspeople in Jordan
Al-Faisaly SC players
Al-Jazeera (Jordan) players
Al-Ramtha SC players
Al-Jaish Damascus players
2011 AFC Asian Cup players
Al-Wehda Club (Mecca) players
Expatriate footballers in Saudi Arabia
Syrian expatriate sportspeople in Saudi Arabia
Saudi Professional League players
2019 AFC Asian Cup players
AC Tripoli players
Lebanese Premier League players
Syrian Premier League players